Quesnelia augustocoburgii is a species of flowering plant in the family Bromeliaceae, endemic to Brazil (the states of Minas Gerais and Rio de Janeiro). It was first described by Heinrich Wawra von Fernsee in 1880. It is found in the Atlantic Forest ecoregion of southeastern Brazil. The name is sometimes spelt with a hyphen as Quesnelia augusto-coburgii.

See also

References

augustocoburgii
Endemic flora of Brazil
Flora of the Atlantic Forest
Flora of Minas Gerais
Flora of Rio de Janeiro (state)
Plants described in 1880